Charles J. Hitch (January 9, 1910 – September 11, 1995) was an American economist and Assistant Secretary of Defense from 1961 to 1965. He later served as vice chancellor (1965–1967) and president (1967–1975) of the University of California and president of Resources for the Future (1975-1978).

Hitch was born in Boonville, Missouri to Arthur M. Hitch and Bertha Johnston. His brother was Thomas Kemper Hitch. He was educated at Kemper Military School before leaving for the University of Arizona, where he became a member of the Delta Chi fraternity and received a BA in economics in 1931. After pursuing graduate studies at Harvard University during the 1931–1932 academic year, he received a Rhodes Scholarship to Oxford University, where he received a second bachelor's degree in 1935 and the Oxbridge MA in 1938. That year, he became the first Rhodes Scholar to join the university's faculty as a fellow of The Queen's College, Oxford.

During World War II, Hitch served as a staff economist under W. Averell Harriman during his special envoyship to Europe before joining the War Production Board. He later served in the Office of Strategic Services as an officer of the United States Army and was discharged at the rank of first lieutenant in 1945.

Between 1948 and 1961, he was head of Rand Corporation's Economics Division in Santa Monica, California. While at Rand, he co-authored with Roland McKean The Economics of Defense in the Nuclear Age (Harvard University Press, 1960), described by the New York Times as the 'bible' for defense budgeting.

He was awarded the UCSF medal in 1975.

As the DOD's comptroller, he was directed by Secretary Robert McNamara to produce a long-term, program-oriented Defense budget that became USDOD's Planning, Programming and Budgeting System (PPBS).

He was posthumously elected to the 2002 class of Fellows of the Institute for Operations Research and the Management Sciences.

References 

 Charles J. Hitch at the University of California digital archives
 Tribute to Charles J. Hitch by Alain C. Enthoven

External links
 Biography of Charles Hitch from the Institute for Operations Research and the Management Sciences

1910 births
1995 deaths
University of Arizona alumni
Harvard University alumni
American Rhodes Scholars
University of California regents
Presidents of the University of California System
Alumni of The Queen's College, Oxford
RAND Corporation people
Fellows of the Econometric Society
Fellows of the Institute for Operations Research and the Management Sciences
20th-century American academics